Muazzamnagar is a village in Gosainganj block of Lucknow district, Uttar Pradesh, India. As of 2011, its population is 753, in 139 households. It is part of the gram panchayat of Kabirpur.

References 

Villages in Lucknow district